Jake Collier (born October 23, 1988) is an American mixed martial artist who competes in the Heavyweight division of the Ultimate Fighting Championship.

Background
With no background in sports, Collier started Brazilian jiu-jitsu to lose weight at the age of 20. Eventually he started competing in the sport, quickly taking his first amateur mixed martial arts bout.

Mixed martial arts career

Early career
After compiling an amateur record of 12–2, Collier made his professional debut in November 2010. He competed primarily for regional organizations around his native state of Missouri. He amassed a record of 7–1 before signing with the UFC on the heels of a first round rear naked choke finish of Gabriel Checco at RFA 19.

Ultimate Fighting Championship
Collier made his promotional debut against Vitor Miranda on December 20, 2014 at UFC Fight Night 58. He lost the fight via TKO in the final seconds of the first round.

Collier next faced Ricardo Abreu on June 6, 2015 at UFC Fight Night 68, filling in for an injured Daniel Sarafian. Collier won the fight via split decision.

Collier faced returning veteran Yang Dongi on November 28, 2015 at UFC Fight Night 79.  He lost the fight via TKO in the second round.

Collier next faced promotional newcomer Alberto Uda on May 29, 2016 at UFC Fight Night 88. He won the fight via TKO in the second round and was awarded a Performance of the Night bonus.

Collier was expected to face Josh Stansbury in a light heavyweight bout on December 3, 2016 at The Ultimate Fighter 24 Finale. However, Collier pulled out of the fight in late October citing injury and was replaced by Devin Clark.

Collier faced Devin Clark on April 15, 2017 at UFC on Fox 24. He lost the fight by unanimous decision.

Collier faced Marcel Fortuna on November 11, 2017 at UFC Fight Night: Poirier vs. Pettis. He won the fight by unanimous decision.

Collier was scheduled to face Marcin Prachnio on February 24, 2018 at UFC on Fox 28. However, on January 4, 2018, he was forced to pull out from the fight citing injury.

On February 16, 2019 it was announced that Collier had tested positive for higenamine in an out of competition test for which he received a ten-month suspension and he will be eligible to compete again on October 27, 2019.

Collier was scheduled to face Tom Aspinall in a heavyweight bout on March 21, 2020 at UFC Fight Night: Woodley vs. Edwards after more than two years of absence from the UFC. However, due to COVID-19 pandemic, the event was cancelled. Subsequently, the pairing was left intact and took place on July 25, 2020 at UFC on ESPN 14. He lost the fight via technical knockout in round one.

Collier faced Gian Villante on December 5, 2020 at UFC on ESPN 19. He won the fight via unanimous decision.

Collier faced Carlos Felipe on June 12, 2021 at UFC 263. He lost the fight by split decision.

Collier faced Chase Sherman on January 15, 2022 at UFC on ESPN 32. He won the bout via rear naked choke submission in round one.  This win earned him the Performance of the Night award.

As the first bout of his new four-fight contract, Collier was scheduled to face Justin Tafa on April 30, 2022, at UFC on ESPN 35.  However, Tafa withdrew from event for undisclosed reasons, and he was replaced by Andrei Arlovski. He lost the bout via split decision. 14 out of 14 media scores gave it to Collier.

Collier faced Chris Barnett on September 10, 2022 at UFC 279. At the weigh-ins, Barnett weighed in at 267.5 pounds, 1.5 pounds over the non-title heavyweight limit. Barnett was fined 20% of his purse, which went to Collier. Despite knocking down Barnett in the first, Collier lost the fight via TKO in the second round.

Collier is scheduled to face Martin Buday on April 15, 2023 at UFC on ESPN 44.

Announced bouts 
Heavyweight bout: Martin Buday vs. Jake Collier

Personal life
Collier has three sons.

Championships and accomplishments

Mixed martial arts
 Ultimate Fighting Championship
 Performance of the Night (Two times)

Mixed martial arts record

|-
|Loss
|align=center|13–8
|Chris Barnett
|TKO (punches)
|UFC 279
|
|align=center|2
|align=center|2:24
|Las Vegas, Nevada, United States
|
|-
|Loss
|align=center|13–7
|Andrei Arlovski
|Decision (split)
|UFC on ESPN: Font vs. Vera 
|
|align=center|3
|align=center|5:00
|Las Vegas, Nevada, United States
|
|-
|Win
|align=center|13–6
|Chase Sherman
|Submission (rear-naked choke)
|UFC on ESPN: Kattar vs. Chikadze
|
|align=center|1
|align=center|2:26
|Las Vegas, Nevada, United States
|
|-
|Loss
|align=center|12–6
|Carlos Felipe
|Decision (split)
|UFC 263 
|
|align=center|3
|align=center|5:00
|Glendale, Arizona, United States
|
|-
|Win
|align=center|12–5
|Gian Villante
|Decision (unanimous)
|UFC on ESPN: Hermansson vs. Vettori
|
|align=center|3
|align=center|5:00
|Las Vegas, Nevada, United States
|
|-
|Loss
|align=center|11–5
|Tom Aspinall
|TKO (knee and punches)
|UFC on ESPN: Whittaker vs. Till 
|
|align=center|1
|align=center|0:45
|Abu Dhabi, United Arab Emirates
|
|-
|Win
|align=center|11–4
|Marcel Fortuna
|Decision (unanimous)
|UFC Fight Night: Poirier vs. Pettis
|
|align=center|3
|align=center|5:00
|Norfolk, Virginia, United States
|
|-
|Loss
|align=center|10–4
|Devin Clark
|Decision (unanimous)
|UFC on Fox: Johnson vs. Reis
|
|align=center|3
|align=center|5:00
|Kansas City, Missouri, United States
|
|-
|Win
|align=center|10–3
|Alberto Uda
|TKO (knee and body kick)
|UFC Fight Night: Almeida vs. Garbrandt
|
|align=center|2
|align=center|1:06
|Las Vegas, Nevada, United States
|
|-
|Loss
|align=center|9–3
|Yang Dongi
|TKO (punches)
|UFC Fight Night: Henderson vs. Masvidal
|
|align=center|2
|align=center|1:50
|Seoul, South Korea
|
|-
|Win
|align=center|9–2
|Ricardo Abreu
|Decision (split)
|UFC Fight Night: Boetsch vs. Henderson
|
|align=center|3
|align=center|5:00
|New Orleans, Louisiana, United States
|
|-
|Loss
|align=center| 8–2
|Vitor Miranda
|TKO (head kick and punches)
|UFC Fight Night: Machida vs. Dollaway
|
|align=center|1
|align=center|4:59
|Barueri, Brazil
|
|-
|Win
|align=center| 8–1
|Gabriel Checco
|Submission (rear-naked choke)
|RFA 19
|
|align=center|1
|align=center|4:27
|Prior Lake, Minnesota, United States
|
|-
| Win
|align=center| 7–1
|Quartus Stitt
|Submission (guillotine choke)
|Rumble Times Promotions
|
|align=center|1
|align=center|1:32
|St. Charles, Missouri, United States
|
|-
| Win
|align=center| 6–1
|Cully Butterfield
|Decision (unanimous)
|Rumble Times Promotions
|
|align=center| 3
|align=center| 5:00
|St. Charles, Missouri, United States
|
|-
| Win
|align=center| 5–1
|Sean Huffman
| TKO (punches)
|Cage Championships 38
|
|align=center|1
|align=center|0:48
|Sullivan, Missouri, United States
|
|-
| Win
|align=center| 4–1
|James Wade
| TKO (punches)
|Cage Championships 37
|
|align=center|1
|align=center|1:22
|Washington, Missouri, United States
|
|-
|Loss
|align=center| 3–1
|Kelvin Tiller
|Submission (triangle choke)
|Fight Me MMA
|
|align=center|1
|align=center|4:40
|St. Charles, Missouri, United States
|
|-
| Win
|align=center| 3–0
|Dan McGlasson
| KO (punch)
|Fight Me MMA
|
|align=center|1
|align=center|1:26
|St. Charles, Missouri, United States
|
|-
| Win
|align=center| 2–0
|Darryl Cobb
| Submission (rear-naked choke)
|Rumble Time Promotions
|
|align=center|3
|align=center|4:08
|St. Charles, Missouri, United States
|
|-
| Win
|align=center| 1–0
|James Wade
| TKO (punches)
|Rumble Time Promotions
|
|align=center|1
|align=center|2:05
|St. Charles, Missouri, United States
|
|-

See also

 List of current UFC fighters
 List of male mixed martial artists

References

External links
 
 

Living people
1988 births
American male mixed martial artists
Middleweight mixed martial artists
Light heavyweight mixed martial artists
Mixed martial artists utilizing Brazilian jiu-jitsu
Mixed martial artists from Missouri
People from Crawford County, Missouri
Doping cases in mixed martial arts
Ultimate Fighting Championship male fighters
American practitioners of Brazilian jiu-jitsu